is a passenger railway station in the town of Yorii, Saitama, Japan. It is operated by the private railway operator Tōbu Railway.

Routes
There are no direct trains to or from Ikebukuro.

Station 
The platform that corresponds to a four-car train has a  length.

Passengers used several fare gates and went out outside of baffle gates because fare calculation had special circumstances. Inbound passengers could use an automatic ticket gate. Outbound travelers could not use automatic ticket gates, so passengers had to get certification upon boarding on the trains (ja:乗車証明書) until Tojo Line's timetable was revised 13 March 2021.

Platform
Outbound and inbound trains share one platform.

Adjacent stations

History
In November 2018, in conjunction with Honda Motor's decision to relocate its factory from Sayama to Yorii, Tōbu Railway was approached to build a station to help alleviate anticipated traffic congestion on Japan National Route 254. Construction began in June 2019 and the new station opened on 31 October 2020.

Surrounding area
 Honda Motor Yorii Automobile Plant

See also
 List of railway stations in Japan

References

External links

  

Railway stations in Saitama Prefecture
Railway stations in Japan opened in 2020
Tobu Tojo Main Line
Stations of Tobu Railway
Yorii, Saitama